The Best of the Fabulous Thunderbirds: Early Birds Special is a 2011 compilation album by Texas-based blues rock band The Fabulous Thunderbirds released on Benchmark Recordings. The album features a collection of songs from the original tracks from their first four albums, live versions, and the hits from their later albums, spanning their first decade of recording and touring.

Track listing
 "Rich Woman"
 "She's Tuff"
 "Tuff Enuff"
 "Scratch My Back" (Live)
 "Bad Boy"
 "Low-Down Woman"
 "Marked Deck"
 "One's Too Many"
 "I Believe I'm in Love"
 "I Hear You Knockin'" (Live)
 "Can't Tear It Up Enuff"
 "You Ain't Nothin' but Fine"
 "Wrap It Up"
 "You're Humbugging Me"
 "The Crawl" (Live)
 "Full Time Lover" (Live)
 "Los Fabulosos Thunderbirds"
 "Powerful Stuff"

Personnel 

Denny Bruce – co-producer
Jon Monday - co-producer
Kim Wilson – vocals and harmonica
Jimmie Vaughan - guitar
Mike Buck – drums
Fran Christina - drums
Keith Ferguson - bass

External links
Official Site

2011 compilation albums
The Fabulous Thunderbirds albums
Albums produced by Denny Bruce